Pupoides albilabris is a species of gastropod belonging to the family Pupillidae.

The species is found in North and Central America.

References

Pupillidae